Willie Lee (July 13, 1950 – October 19, 2017) was an American football defensive tackle in the National Football League who played for the Kansas City Chiefs. He played college football for the Bethune–Cookman Wildcats.

Lee died in 2017.

References

1950 births
2017 deaths
American football defensive tackles
Kansas City Chiefs players
Bethune–Cookman Wildcats football players
Sportspeople from Daytona Beach, Florida